Kevin Darrigan (born 15 October 1931) is a former Australian rules footballer who played with Collingwood and Fitzroy in the Victorian Football League (VFL).

Notes

External links 

Living people
1931 births
Australian rules footballers from Victoria (Australia)
Collingwood Football Club players
Fitzroy Football Club players